Shinichi Ishizue (礎 眞一, Ishizue Shinichi) is a Japanese Paralympic judoka. In 1988, the debut for judo in the Paralympics, he won the gold medal in men's 65 kg.

Four years later, in 1992, he attempted to defend his title, but only won a silver medal when Juan Damian Matos defeated him in the final.

References

Paralympic judoka of Japan
Judoka at the 1988 Summer Paralympics
Judoka at the 1992 Summer Paralympics
Paralympic gold medalists for Japan
Paralympic silver medalists for Japan
Living people
Japanese male judoka
Year of birth missing (living people)
Medalists at the 1988 Summer Paralympics
Medalists at the 1992 Summer Paralympics
Paralympic medalists in judo
20th-century Japanese people
21st-century Japanese people